Goes pulcher is a species of beetle in the family Cerambycidae. It was first described by Haldeman in 1847, originally under the genus Monohammus. It is known from Canada and the United States.

References

Lamiini
Beetles described in 1847